Leslie George Baker (19 May 1904 – 9 August 1976) was an English cricketer. Baker was a right-handed batsman. He was born in High Wycombe, Buckinghamshire and was educated at Bedford School and London University.

Baker made his debut for Buckinghamshire in the 1924 Minor Counties Championship against the Surrey Second XI.  He played Minor counties cricket for Buckinghamshire from 1924 to 1947, which included 113 Minor Counties Championship matches. He made a single first-class appearance for a combined Minor Counties cricket team against the touring West Indians in 1939 at Lord's. In this match he scored 6 runs in the Minor Counties first-innings before being dismissed by Foffie Williams.

He died in his hometown on 9 August 1976.

References

External links
Leslie Baker at ESPNcricinfo
Leslie Baker at CricketArchive

1904 births
1976 deaths
Sportspeople from High Wycombe
People educated at Bedford School
Alumni of the University of London
English cricketers
Buckinghamshire cricketers
Minor Counties cricketers